The 1946 Kilkenny Senior Hurling Championship was the 52nd staging of the Kilkenny Senior Hurling Championship since its establishment by the Kilkenny County Board.

On 10 November 1946, Thomastown won the championship after a 5-04 to 4-05 defeat of Carrickshock in the final. It was their first ever championship title. Carrickshock lost a third successive final for the second time in their history.

Results

Final

References

Kilkenny Senior Hurling Championship
Kilkenny Senior Hurling Championship